José María Maravall Herrero is a Spanish academic and a politician of the Spanish Socialist Party.

Education 
Maravall holds doctorates from both the Complutense University of Madrid and Oxford University, as well as a Honorary D.Litt. from Warwick University.

Career 
Maravall was, until his retirement, the director of the Centre for Advanced Studies in the Social Sciences (CEACS -Juan March Institute in Madrid) and a professor at the Complutense University of Madrid. He has taught at the University of Warwick and, as a visiting professor, at the universities of New York (NYU), Columbia, Harvard, and the European University Institute (Florence). He has had a long personal political experience, first in underground anti-Francoist politics and later, under democracy, in social democratic politics. He was the Spanish Minister of Education and Science from 1982 to 1988, and was a member of the Spanish Parliament.

Awards and honors 
Maravall is an Honorary Fellow of St. Antony's College (Oxford), a Corresponding Fellow of the British Academy (FBA), and a foreign member of the American Academy of Arts and Sciences.  He is a "Commandeur de l'Ordre des Palmes Academiques" in France and has won the National Award for Political Science and Sociology in Spain.

Works 

 Dictatorship and Political Dissent (Dictadura y Disentimiento Político), St. Martin's Press, 1978 
 The Transition to Democracy in Spain (La Política de la Transición), St. Martin's Press, 1982 
 Economic Reforms in New Democracies (co-author with Luiz Carlos Bresser and Adam Przeworski), Cambridge University Press, 1993 
 Los Resultados de la Democracia, Alianza Editorial, 1995 
 Regimes, Politics and Markets, Oxford University Press, 1997
 El Control de los Políticos, Taurus, 2003
 Democracy and the Rule of Law (co-editor with Adam Przeworski), Cambridge University Press, 2003
 La Confrontación Politica, Taurus, 2008
 Controlling Governments (co-editor with Ignacio Sánchez-Cuenca), Cambridge University Press 2008
 Las Promesas Políticas, Galaxia Gutenberg 2013
 Demands on Democracy, Oxford University Press, 2016
  La Democracia y la Izquierda, Galaxia Gutenberg 2021.

External links
 El PP crispa para que no voten los centristas and Los partidos de izquierda son para muchos una vía para resolver sus problemas materiales, two interviews with Maravall by El País. Adam Przeworski and Ignacio Sánchez-Cuenca (eds.), Democracy and Socialdemocracy: Hommage to José María Maravall (CEPCO). Maria Antonia Iglesias, La Memoria Recuperada, Madrid: Taurus, 2003.

1942 births
Living people
Politicians from Madrid
Spanish political scientists
Complutense University of Madrid alumni
Complutense University of Madrid
Spanish Socialist Workers' Party politicians
Government ministers of Spain
Members of the 3rd Congress of Deputies (Spain)
Corresponding Fellows of the British Academy